David Alegre Biosca (born 6 September 1984) is a Spanish former field hockey player who played as a midfielder for the Spanish national team.

Alegre was born in Terrassa and started playing hockey at age four at Club Egara and retired in 2021 at Real Club de Polo. He also played for the Uttar Pradesh Wizards and Oranje Zwart. His older brother Ramón was also a field hockey international for Spain. He played a total of 295 times for the Spanish national team from 2003 until 2021.

Club career
David played in Spain for Club Egara until 2009, when moved to the Netherlands to play for Oranje Zwart. After two seasons with Oranje Zwart, he returned to Spain to play for Real Club de Polo. He also represented the Uttar Pradesh Wizards in the Hockey India League.

International career
Alegre made his debut for the Spain national team in 2003 against Germany. He finished in fourth position with the national team at the 2004 Summer Olympics in Athens, Greece, and in sixth at the 2012 Summer Olympics.  However, in between he was part of the 2008 Summer Olympics team which won a silver medal. The midfielder has also played in three World Cups. He took a break from the national team in 2016 to focus on his work. After not having played for three years for the national team he returned in the team in October 2019 for the 2019 FIH Olympic Qualifiers. On 25 May 2021, he was selected in the squad for the 2021 EuroHockey Championship. He retired from playing hockey after the 2020 Summer Olympics.

References

External links
 
 
 
 

1984 births
Living people
Spanish male field hockey players
Male field hockey midfielders
Olympic field hockey players of Spain
Field hockey players at the 2004 Summer Olympics
2006 Men's Hockey World Cup players
Field hockey players at the 2008 Summer Olympics
2010 Men's Hockey World Cup players
Field hockey players at the 2012 Summer Olympics
2014 Men's Hockey World Cup players
Field hockey players at the 2016 Summer Olympics
Field hockey players at the 2020 Summer Olympics
Olympic silver medalists for Spain
Olympic medalists in field hockey
Medalists at the 2008 Summer Olympics
Sportspeople from Terrassa
Club Egara players
Oranje Zwart players
Real Club de Polo de Barcelona players
Expatriate field hockey players
Spanish expatriate sportspeople in the Netherlands
Hockey India League players
Uttar Pradesh Wizards players
Men's Hoofdklasse Hockey players
División de Honor de Hockey Hierba players